Dreams of Fireflies (On a Christmas Night) is an EP by the rock band Trans-Siberian Orchestra. It was released in 2012 on Lava Records, and is based on the fourth movement (Winter) of Vivaldi's Four Seasons.

Commercial performance
The album debuted at No. 9 on the Billboard 200 albums chart on its first week of release, selling around 31,000 copies in the United States in its first week. It also debuted at No. 3 on Billboard's Rock Albums chart, No. 1 on the Hard Rock Albums chart, as well as No. 2 on the Top Holiday Albums chart. As of October 2015, the album has sold 344,000 copies in the US.

Track listing

Personnel

Trans-Siberian Orchestra
 Paul O'Neill - guitars
 Jon Oliva - keyboards
 Al Pitrelli - lead guitar, rhythm guitar
 Chris Caffery - guitars
 Roddy Chong - violin
 Angus Clark - guitars
 Joel Hoekstra - guitars
 Mee Eun Kim - keyboards
 Vitalij Kuprij - keyboards
 Jane Mangini - keyboards
 Johnny Lee Middleton - bass guitar
 John O'Reilly - drums
 Jeff Plate - drums
 Derek Wieland - keyboards
 David Zablidowsky - bass
 Dave Wittman - drums, guitar & bass inserts
 Erika Jerry - lead vocals on "I Had A Memory"
 Tim Hockenberry - lead vocals on "Someday"
 Georgia Napolitano - lead vocals on "Time You Should Be Sleeping (Christmas Lullaby)"

Production
 Paul O'Neill - producer

Charts

Weekly charts

Year-end charts

References

External links

Trans-Siberian Orchestra albums
Concept albums
2012 EPs
Lava Records albums
Music for Nations albums
Albums produced by Paul O'Neill (rock producer)